Samoa competed at the 2011 Pacific Games in Nouméa, New Caledonia between August 27 and September 10, 2011. As of June 28, 2011 Samoa has listed 318 competitors.

Archery

Samoa has qualified 9 athletes.

Men
Joshua Hans Walter
Eddie Pengcheng Chan Pao
Ofele John Lene
Tuala Olivetti Ah Him
Muaausa Joseph Walter

Women
Sita Telesia Sefo-Martel
Aloema Tuimalealiifano
Ofa Perosi Sua
Elsie Linda Ula

Athletics

Samoa has qualified 5 athletes.

Men
Emanuele Fuamatu -  Shot Put
Franco Patu
Shaka Sola -  Shot Put
John Bosco Stowers
Siuloga Viliamu

Women
Margaret Satupai -  Discus Throw,  Shot Put,  Hammer Throw

Basketball

Samoa has qualified a men's and women's team.  Each team can consist of a maximum of 12 athletes

Men
Ezra Tufuga
Flynn Fidow
George Tuia
Iosefo Folassaitu
Jason Tanuvasa
Meki Purcell
Naotala Johnathan Fesolai
Ratu Epeli Levy
Ropati Tusiga
Ryder Fuimaono
Samuelu Taelega
Talalelei Pauga

Women
Abish Lolesi
Anna Silva
Charlotte Davis
Eirenei Alesana
Ilona Silva
Juanita Hopkins
Karli Tuia
Sesa Lolesi
Suzannah Hicks
Tania Uluheua

Bodybuilding

Samoa has qualified 14 athletes.

Men
Christopher Brown -  -90 kg
Filpo Laulusa -  -85 kg
Rico Leiataua
Jacob Lemalu
Sue Lemalu
Iusi Ligaliga -  -80 kg
Willy Matautia
Sakaio Puletuu -  -70 kg
Mao Sanele -  -100 kg
Fata Su'a
Benjamin Tamanikayaroi

Women
Eleanor Cockburn
Elenor Stewart
Debra Teiho

Boxing

Samoa has qualified 7 athletes.

Men
Mosese Pousoo -  -56 kg
Sinapapa Sanele
Livai Hinoma -  -64 kg
Henry Tyrell -  -69 kg
Petelo Matagi -  -75 kg
Filimaua Hala -  -81 kg
Posala Pelo

Canoeing

Samoa has qualified 7 athletes.

Men
Jaffray James Ah Kuoi -  V6 1500m,  V6 30 km
Thomas Erik Duffie -  V6 1500m,  V6 30 km
Ioane Paulo Papali'i -  V6 1500m,  V6 30 km
Joshua Manihera Perese -  V6 1500m,  V6 30 km
Michael Sala -  V6 1500m,  V6 30 km
Mark Williams -  V6 1500m,  V6 30 km

Women
Diana Logovi'i Tauvale

Golf

Samoa has qualified 8 athletes.

Men
Pulou Faaaliga -  Team Tournament
Patrick Fepuleai -  Team Tournament
Malase Maifea -  Team Tournament
Niko Vui -  Team Tournament

Women
Olive Auva'a -  Team Tournament
Senetima Leavaiseeta -  Team Tournament
Leleaga Meredith -  Team Tournament
Bronwyn Tavita Sesega -  Team Tournament

Judo

Samoa has qualified 8 athletes.

Men
Frank Stowers
Toshio Suzuki
Jerry Ta'avao
Abner Waterhouse
Aleni Smith
Jay Vaai

Women
Segia Ah Siu
Ladesha Stevenson

Powerlifting

Samoa has qualified 6 athletes.

Men
Safoa Togia
Vincent Afoa
Ofisa Ofisa Jr -  -105 kg
Afaaso Saleupu Jr
Tavita Lipine -  -120 kg
Oliva Kirisome -  +120 kg

Women
Fila Fuamatu -  -84 kg

Rugby Sevens

Samoa has qualified a men's and women's team.  Each team can consist of a maximum of 12 athletes.

Men -  Team Tournament
Simaika Mikaele
Afa Aiono
Levi Asi
Falemiga Selesele
Fale Sooialo
Uale Mai
Lolo Lui
Tom Iosefo
Reupena Levasa
Mikaele Pesamino
Robert Lilomaiava
Patrick Faapale

Women -  Team Tournament
Maria Jacinta Ausai
Taalili Iosefo
Faranisisi Alaivai
Filoi Eneliko
Soteria Pulumu
Seifono Misili
Taliilagi Mefi
Fetu Pulumu
Tafale Roma Malesi
Rowena Faaiuaso
Vailoa Sale Pao
Sapina Aukusitino

Sailing

Samoa has qualified 4 athletes.

Eroni Tui Leilua -  Laser Men Team
Myka Stanley -  Laser Men Team
Valerie Humrich -  Laser Women Team
Aloma Black -  Laser Women Team

Shooting

Samoa has qualified 7 athletes.

Eddie Pengcheng Chan Pao -  Double Barrel Team
Pesamino Pereira
Toddystanley Iosefa -  Double Barrel Team
Siegfried Levi
Paul Roy Cheetah Loibl -  Double Barrel Team
Leasi Vainalepa Galuvao
Robert Wayne Maskell -  Double Barrel Individual

Squash

Samoa has qualified 5 athletes.

Men
Chad Rankin -  Double Tournament
Jordan Ah Liki
Ivan Chew Lit -  Double Tournament
Jobenz Manoa
Alan Schwalger

Women
Luciana Meredith Thompson -  Double Tournament
Fiona Ah Fook -  Double Tournament

Taekwondo

Samoa has qualified 5 athletes.

Men
Kaino Peter Thomsen -  -87 kg
Epati Lafaialii

Women
Lealofisaolefaleomalietoa Mavaeao -  -62 kg
Taliai Mika -  -67 kg
Talitiga Crawley

Tennis

Samoa has qualified 8 athletes.

Men
Leon So'Onalole -  Double Tournament,  Mixed Double Tournament,  Team Tournament
Juan Langton -  Double Tournament,  Mixed Double Tournament,  Team Tournament
Marvin So'Onalole -  Team Tournament
Reinsford Penn

Women
Kim Carruthers -  Double Tournament,  Team Tournament
Steffi Carruthers -  Mixed Double Tournament,  Double Tournament,  Team Tournament
Maylani Ah Hoy -  Mixed Double Tournament,  Team Tournament
Tagifano So'Onalole -  Team Tournament

Triathlon

Samoa has qualified 2 athletes.

Men
Akmal Khan
Kantaro Oishi

Volleyball

Indoor Volleyball

Samoa has qualified a men's and women's team.  Each team can consist of a maximum of 12 members.

Men
Werner Siegfried Jahnke
Laurina Aisaka
Makatea Talalelei
Lomitusi Ulu
Saulo Tulaimalo
Itula Leota
Ioane Talelelei Gago
Eneliko Tui
Savaii Tupou Fiu
Aitupe Leuta

Women -  Team Tournament
Uluiva Faavaoga
Adrianna Katrina Seufatu
Uputaua Pritchard
Taulaga Sulu Malaitai
Theresa Taililino Malatai
Tamara Taviuni
Perelini Mulitalo
Gasolo Sanele Pio
Samalaulu Faavaeaga
Jacqueline Lole Nuuvali
Grace Lina Leo

Weightlifting

Samoa has qualified 2 athletes.

Men
Toafitu Perive -  -69 kg Clean & Jerk,  -69 kg Snatch,  -69 kg Total
Bob Pesaleli

References

Sources

2011 in Samoan sport
Nations at the 2011 Pacific Games
Samoa at the Pacific Games